The Izaak Walton League is an American environmental organization founded in 1922 that promotes natural resource protection and outdoor recreation.  The organization was founded in Chicago, Illinois, by a group of sportsmen who wished to protect fishing opportunities for future generations.  They named the league after seminal fishing enthusiast Izaak Walton (1593-1683), known as the "Father of Flyfishing" and author of The Compleat Angler.  Advertising executive Will Dilg became its first president and promoter.  The first conservation organization with a mass membership, the League had over 100,000 supporters by 1924.  An early result of their efforts was the establishment of the Upper Mississippi River National Wildlife and Fish Refuge in 1924.

The League led unsuccessful efforts in the 1930s for clean water legislation but achieved initial success with the passage of federal water pollution acts in 1948 and 1956.  Its major victory came with passage of the Clean Water Act of 1972.  The League continues to advocate for preserving wetlands, protecting wilderness, and promoting soil and water conservation.  Its Save Our Streams (SOS) program involves activists in all fifty states in monitoring water quality.  In the 1930s, the League worked with the noted conservationist Frederick Russell Burnham and the Arizona Boy Scouts to save the bighorn sheep.  These efforts led to the establishment in 1939 of two bighorn game ranges in Arizona: Kofa National Wildlife Refuge and Cabeza Prieta National Wildlife Refuge.

Although the League's membership declined by the 1960s to a stable level around 50,000, the organization retains a firm base of anglers in the Midwest and Tidewater, with more than 200 chapters across the country.  The League publishes a quarterly magazine, Outdoor America, which covers the League's activities as well as the environment.  They are headquartered in Gaithersburg, Maryland.

Accomplishments

In the 1940s, the Izaak Walton League of America played an integral part in protecting the Jackson Hole National Monument from the cattle industry in Teton County. They also helped to support the transition of the monument into Grand Teton National Park.

In May 1973, the League sued the U.S. Department of Agriculture over the clearcut logging of Monongahela National Forest in West Virginia as being contrary to the law, which stated in part, "only dead, physically mature, and large growth trees individually marked for cutting" could be sold. The US District Court ruled in favor of the League. The ruling was appealed; on August 21, 1975, the Fourth Court of Appeals upheld the lower court's decision.

The ramifications of this local decision for forestry and the timber industry nationally led to efforts to repeal the Organic Act. This resulted in a new law passed by Congress: the National Forest Management Act of 1976, which repealed major portions of the Organic Act.

The Columbus Izaak Walton League Lodge, in Columbus, Nebraska, is listed on the National Register of Historic Places.

Notable chapters
IWLA Diana Chapter (1948)

Notes

References
Fox, Stephen John Muir and His Legacy: The American Conservation Movement (Boston: Little, Brown and Co., 1981),   
Godfrey, Anthony The Ever-Changing View-A History of the National Forests in California (USDA Forest Service Publishers, 2005)

Further reading

External links
 Izaak Walton League of America official site
Izaak Walton League of America. Wyoming Division records at the University of Wyoming - American Heritage Center

Environmental organizations based in the United States
History of Chicago
Non-profit organizations based in Chicago
Organizations established in 1922
1922 in the United States
1922 in the environment
Fisheries conservation organizations
1922 establishments in Illinois